The Magna Græcia University of Catanzaro is a university located in Catanzaro, Italy. It was founded in 1998 and is organized in three faculties.

Organization
The three faculties are:
 Faculty of Law
 Faculty of Medicine and Surgery
 Faculty of Pharmacy

See also 
 List of Italian universities
 Catanzaro

External links
Magna Græcia University of Catanzaro Website 

Universities in Italy
Catanzaro
Educational institutions established in 1998
Buildings and structures in the Province of Catanzaro
Education in Calabria
1998 establishments in Italy